Dan Herbeck (born October 31, 1954) is an American journalist and author who is an investigative reporter at The Buffalo News.

Biography
Herbeck was born in Mineral Wells, Texas, and raised in Amherst, New York. Herbeck graduated high school in 1972 from Sweet Home High School in Amherst New York. In 2012 he was inducted into the high school's Alumni Hall of Fame. After graduating from Erie Community College, Herbeck graduated from St. Bonaventure University in 1978 with a bachelor's degree in journalism. He was inducted into the Erie Community College Alumni Hall of Fame in 2013 and is also a member of the St. Bonaventure Mass Communications Wall of Fame.

Journalism career
Herbeck has been writing for The Buffalo News since 1978. With his frequent Buffalo News partners Lou Michel and Michael Beebe, he has won national and state awards for investigative stories on telemarketing fraud, bankruptcy fraud, government corruption, the New York state prison system, prescription drug abuse and other issues.

American Terrorist
Herbeck co-wrote American Terrorist, with Lou Michel about Timothy McVeigh, whom they interviewed. The book by Herbeck and Michel was a New York Times bestseller in 2001. It detailed the life story of McVeigh, a U.S. Army veteran who grew up near Buffalo, New York, who was convicted and put to death in connection with the 1995 Oklahoma City terrorist bombing, in which 168 people died.

Personal life
With his wife Joyce, Herbeck has two sons. Chris and Richard Herbeck. He has a grandson named Everett Herbeck

References

External links
"Dan Herbeck: A bucket-list trip from Buffalo to my birthplace"
"McVeigh author Dan Herbeck quizzed"; bbc.co.uk; accessed 11 May 2014.

1954 births
Living people
21st-century American non-fiction writers
American male journalists
Journalists from Upstate New York
American biographers
American investigative journalists
American male biographers
St. Bonaventure University alumni
People from Mineral Wells, Texas
People from Amherst, New York
Historians from New York (state)
21st-century American male writers